Erik the Red (c. 950 – c. 1003) was a Viking explorer.

Erik the Red may also refer to:

Erik Denmark (born about 1980), a competitive eater nicknamed Erik "The Red" Denmark
Eric the Red (album), by Týr
Erik the Red (wrestler), the ring name of Ib Solvang Hansen (1934–1978)
Erik the Red's Land, an area on the coast of eastern Greenland
Saga of Erik the Red, a 13th-century account of Norse exploration in the North Atlantic